Gao Mengmeng (born 17 January 1993) is a Chinese karateka. She won the silver medal in the women's kumite +68 kg event at the 2018 Asian Games held in Jakarta, Indonesia.

At the 2019 Asian Karate Championships held in Tashkent, Uzbekistan, she won one of the bronze medals in the women's kumite +68 kg event. She also won the bronze medal in the women's team kumite event.

Achievements

References

External links 
 

Living people
1993 births
Place of birth missing (living people)
Chinese female karateka
Karateka at the 2018 Asian Games
Medalists at the 2018 Asian Games
Asian Games medalists in karate
Asian Games silver medalists for China
21st-century Chinese women